Gunakari (Dargwa: Гьунахъари) is a rural locality (a selo) in Buskrinsky Selsoviet, Dakhadayevsky District, Republic of Dagestan, Russia. The population was 371 as of 2010. There are 2 streets.

Geography
Gunakari is located 11 km northeast of Urkarakh (the district's administrative centre) by road. Kalkni and Dibgashi are the nearest rural localities.

Nationalities 
Dargins live there.

References 

Rural localities in Dakhadayevsky District